Alan or Allen Ford may refer to:

People
Alan Ford (actor) (born 1938), English actor
Alan Ford (architect) (born 1952), American architect and author
Alan Ford (Canadian football) (born 1943), Canadian Football League player and manager
Alan Ford (swimmer) (1923–2008), American swimmer 
Al Ford (born 1950), Canadian boxer
Allan Ford (born 1968), convicted of the killing of Louise Jensen

Other uses
Alan Ford (comics), Italian comic book series